Namps-Quevauvillers is a railway station located in the commune of Namps-Maisnil and near Quevauvillers, in the Somme department, France. The station is served by TER Hauts-de-France trains from Amiens to Abancourt. The station is one of several low importance stations along the 139 km long line. According to the SNCF, in 2003 it averaged 5 passengers per operating day.

See also
List of SNCF stations in Hauts-de-France

References

Namps